Walter Lee Young, Jr. (born December 7, 1979) is an American football wide receiver who played for both the Carolina Panthers and the Pittsburgh Steelers. He was originally a seventh-round pick (226th overall) in the 2003 NFL Draft out of the University of Illinois by the Panthers.

Born in Chicago Heights, Illinois, USA, Young attended Rich East High School in Park Forest, Illinois, where he earned all-state honors as a quarterback.

Originally a quarterback, Young switched to wide receiver as a redshirt sophomore at the University of Illinois in 2000.  Starting seven games that year, Young finished the season with 27 receptions for 403 yards.  As a junior, Young started 11 games and finished second on the team with 50 catches for 890 yards and eight touchdowns, while averaging a team-leading 17.8 yards per catch.  In his senior year of 2002, Young started 12 games and again ranked second on the team with 56 catches for 822 yards and six touchdowns.  Young finished his college career ranking third on the Illini all-time list with 2,382 receiving yards and 15 touchdown receptions, and fifth with 147 receptions.

As a college player at Illinois, Young also played on the Fighting Illini basketball team. As a junior (2001–02), Young played in two games for the basketball team, managing to score two points in a game against Wisconsin. Young became the first Fighting Illini athlete since 1973 to appear in games for both the football and basketball teams in the same season.

Young was chosen in the seventh round of the 2003 NFL Draft by the Carolina Panthers and played seven games as a rookie. In 2006, Young played for the Frankfurt Galaxy of NFL Europe.  Young finished the regular season as the team's second-leading receiver, with 31 receptions for 370 yards and 3 touchdowns in 10 games.

In the 2006 NFL season, Young played in two games with the Steelers and recorded his first—and only—career NFL catch (17 yards from Ben Roethlisberger). He was cut from the Pittsburgh Steelers roster on September 1, 2007.

Young currently works in trade show operations for GCJ Management.

References

External links
 Pittsburgh Steelers biography

1979 births
Living people
People from Chicago Heights, Illinois
African-American players of American football
Players of American football from Illinois
American men's basketball players
American football wide receivers
Illinois Fighting Illini football players
Illinois Fighting Illini men's basketball players
Carolina Panthers players
Pittsburgh Steelers players
Frankfurt Galaxy players
American expatriate sportspeople in Germany
21st-century African-American sportspeople
20th-century African-American sportspeople